The 2008 World Ladies Snooker Championship was the 2008 edition of the World Women's Snooker Championship, first held in 1976, and was played at Cambridge Snooker Centre from 3 to 7 May. The tournament was won by Reanne Evans, who achieved her fourth consecutive world title by defeating June Banks 5–2 in the final. Evans also made the highest  of the tournament, 102.

There were four round-robin qualifying groups, three of six players each, and one of seven players, with the top two players in each group progressing into the knockout stage. Evans compiled a break of 52 in the next frame to win it, then took five of the next six frames. Hannah Jones, aged 11, won the under-21 title in an event run alongside the main tournament.

Main Draw

References 

2008 in English sport
2008 in snooker
2008 in women's sport
May 2008 sports events in the United Kingdom
International sports competitions hosted by England
2008